Montgomery County Courthouse is a historic courthouse located at Troy, Montgomery County, North Carolina.  It was designed by the architectural firm of Benton & Benton and built in 1921.  It is a three-story, rectangular tan brick building in the Classical Revival style.  It features a pedimented tetrastyle Doric order pedimented portico  with a clock in the tympanum of the pediment. The interior was remodeled in 1976.

It was added to the National Register of Historic Places in 1979.

Gallery

References

County courthouses in North Carolina
Courthouses on the National Register of Historic Places in North Carolina
Neoclassical architecture in North Carolina
Government buildings completed in 1921
Buildings and structures in Montgomery County, North Carolina
National Register of Historic Places in Montgomery County, North Carolina